SiretuI Bacǎu is a Romanian oina team in the National Senior Championship.

External links
 Romanian Federation of Oina

Oina teams